Ronan Kerr was a Police Service of Northern Ireland (PSNI) officer killed by a booby-trap car bomb planted outside his home on 2 April 2011 at Highfield Close, just off the Gortin Road (the B48), near Killyclogher on the northern outskirts of Omagh in County Tyrone. Responsibility for the attack was later claimed by a dissident republican group claiming to be made of former members of the Provisional IRA.

Constable Kerr was Roman Catholic, a group which at the time constituted approximately 30% of PSNI officers (a proportion recruitment policies were trying to increase), and was 25 at the time of his death. He was a member of a Gaelic Athletic Association club, the Beragh Red Knights. The guard of honour at Kerr's funeral was formed of club members and PSNI officers, a funeral also attended by the leaders of Ireland's four main churches.

Reaction

His murder was condemned by almost all sections of Northern Irish politics and society as well as bringing international condemnation. On 6 April, a peace rally was organised in Belfast by the Irish Congress of Trade Unions (Ictu), which was reported to have been attended by up to 7000 persons. Similar events were held in Omagh, Enniskillen, and London.

BBC Ireland correspondent Mark Simpson commented, in relation to the unified response of the community, "A murder designed to divide people has actually brought them closer together."

Graffiti praising the murder was daubed on walls in predominantly republican areas of Derry.

Investigation
On 26 July 2011, five men were arrested in connection with the investigation. They were later released.

On 26 November 2012, investigating detectives announced the arrest of a 22-year-old man in Milton Keynes. On 27 November, a 39-year-old man in County Tyrone was arrested and questioned.

On 16 May 2017, officers from the PSNI's Serious Crime Branch arrested two men under the Terrorism Act in connection with the murder. A 27-year-old man was arrested in Omagh, and a 40-year-old man was produced into police custody from prison.

In June 2018, a man from Coalisland, County Tyrone, was charged with three terrorism-related charges. These charges were connected to searches in Coalisland in the course of the murder investigation. The charges were dropped in June 2019.

A number of searches had been conducted in the months leading up to the arrests, and Kerr's death had been widely condemned at the time. His murder came during a period of relative peace in Northern Ireland following the signing of the Good Friday Agreement in 1998. However, recent political crises and concerns about the activities of paramilitary groups have undermined the peace process.

References

Terrorist incidents in the United Kingdom in 2011
2011 crimes in Ireland
Car and truck bombings in Northern Ireland
Deaths by person in Northern Ireland
Terrorism deaths in Northern Ireland
2011 murders in the United Kingdom
2011 in Northern Ireland
21st century in County Tyrone
Crime in County Tyrone
April 2011 crimes
Attacks by Republicans since the Good Friday Agreement
2010s murders in Northern Ireland